Papilio rex, the regal swallowtail or king papilio, is a butterfly of the family Papilionidae. It is found in Africa.
It is a semi-montane and montane forest (1, 300 m. to 2 600 m.) species.
The larvae feed on Teclea tricocarpa, Teclea stuhlmanni, Calodendrum, Citrus, Clausena, Fagara and Toddalia species.
In the early morning and late afternoon adults of both sexes descend from the forest canopy to feed from the flowers of Lantana, Impatiens and Bougainvillea.It hilltops on granite outcrops and  mud puddles.

The Kenyan forms mimic Tirumala formosa, the forest monarch butterfly.

Description
The ground colour is black. There are numerous white markings and the base of the forewing is orange brown (sometimes black with a white streak in males).

Taxonomy
Papilio rex is a member of the dardanus species group. The members of the clade are:

Papilio dardanus Brown, 1776
Papilio constantinus Ward, 1871
Papilio delalandei Godart, [1824]
Papilio phorcas Cramer, [1775]
Papilio rex Oberthür, 1886

Subspecies
Papilio rex rex (Kenya (east of the Rift Valley), north-eastern Tanzania, central Tanzania)
Papilio rex mimeticus Rothschild, 1897 (Congo Republic, Uganda, Rwanda, Burundi, north-western Tanzania, western Kenya)
Papilio rex franciscae Carpenter, 1928 (southern Sudan, south-western Ethiopia)
Papilio rex alinderi Bryk, 1928  (Kenya (highlands west of the Rift Valley))
Papilio rex schultzei Aurivillius, 1904 (eastern Nigeria, highlands of Cameroon)
Papilio rex abyssinicana Vane-Wright, 1995  (highlands of south-eastern Ethiopia)
Papilio rex regulana Vane-Wright, 1995 (Kenya (highlands east of the Rift Valley))

Biogeographic realm
Afrotropical realm

References

Carcasson, R.H. 1960 "The Swallowtail Butterflies of East Africa (Lepidoptera, Papilionidae)". Journal of the East Africa Natural History Society pdf Key to East Africa members of the species group, diagnostic and other notes and figures. (Permission to host granted by The East Africa Natural History Society)

External links

Butterfly Corner Images from Naturhistorisches Museum Wien

Butterflies described in 1886
rex
Butterflies of Africa
Taxa named by Charles Oberthür